Wray Serna is an American independent fashion designer and entrepreneur based in New York City. She is the founder of WRAY, a clothing, swimwear, and accessories brand known for its eclectic prints and beautifully constructed, easy to wear pieces, and Cofounder and Chief Design Officer of Cloth.

Early life
Serna was born in Logan, Utah and moved with her family to Illinois and California. She is a graduate of the California College of the Arts where she studied fashion design, painting, and drawing, with extended studies at Parsons School of Design, Paris.

Career and brand

Fashion
Founded in 2015 by Wray Serna, WRAY is a New York-based contemporary womenswear collection. Each season, Serna builds on influences from modern and contemporary sculpture and painting to create clothing focused on form and function. While her collections are designed and developed in NYC, every garment is created ethically at fair-trade, family-owned operations in India. In early 2020, just as WRAY's designs were in the process of pattern grading to extended sizes, wardrobe stylist  Rebecca Grice approached her for Shrill (TV series), starring Aidy Bryant. Grice is an avid supporter of independent brands and acknowledges Wray as one of a handful of independent designers that go the extra mile for plus sizes. Vogue has also recognized Wray for her effort to be truly inclusive by making every single garment is a full size range.   Wray's clothes are worn by celebrities and artists including Dakota Johnson, Molly Bernard, Hilary Duff, Aidy Bryant, Maya Rudolph, Sasheer Zamata, and Japanese organizing consultant, Marie Kondo. In 2021, Wray designed the wedding dress worn by actress Molly Bernard specifically for her marriage ceremony.

Technology
Serna is co-founder and Chief Design Officer of Cloth, a fashion app. A unique profiling system gives retailers a better sense of who their customers are and what is in their closets, allowing them to better target and engage their customers.

Personal life
Serna and her partner, artist Ethan Cook, divide their time between their Clinton Hill apartment and their country home in the Catskills.

References

External links 
 
 Cloth official website
 

Living people
American fashion businesspeople
American fashion designers
American women fashion designers
California College of the Arts alumni
1983 births
21st-century American women